Münir Göle (born 1961 in Istanbul) is a Turkish writer and photographer, who lives and works in Italy.

Photography

Publications

 Châteaux et temples (calendar), 1991
 Swiss Landscapes (calendar), 1992
 Mnemosyne (monograph), 2007, Ultra,Istanbul (Turkish, English), 2010, Editions de l'Aire (French)
 Yol Durumu (book of photography and essays), 2009, YKY, Istanbul
 Quipu (monograph), 2010, Editions de l'Aire (French)
 Fogo (monograph). 2017, Alakarga
 TromsØ (monograph). 2018, Alakarga
 Eyjafjallajökull (monograph). 2020, Alakarga
 Biei (monograph). 2020, Alakarga
 Portfolios, book front covers, landscape-portrait-jazz photography published in international periodicals and press

Exhibitions
 Mesure du Temps, Geneva, 1991
 Lumières de Mémoire. Geneva, 1992
 Bellek Işığı. Istanbul, 1992
 Luce della Memoria. Lugano, 1994
 Jazz. Geneva. 1996
 Sessizliğin Sesi. Istanbul, 1996
 John Fowles and Behind the Magus. Ankara, 2000
 La Note Fantôme. Paris, 2004
 Passages. Geneva, 2010

Literary works

Books

 Yansılar Kitabı (The Book of Reflections), 1997, (Afa, Istanbul)
 Uzak Bir Gölge (A Faraway Shadow), 2000, (Can, Istanbul)
 Sarı Zarf (The Yellow Envelope), 2001, (Alakarga, Istanbul)
 Surat Buruşturmalık 52 Metin (52 Sour Texts), 2002, (Sel, Istanbul)
 Kaçamamak (Inescapable), 2005, (Can, Istanbul)
 Fısıltılar (Whispers), 2007, (Can, Istanbul)
 Yol Durumu (The Condition of Roads), 2009, (YKY, Istanbul)
 Yırtık (The Rip), 2010, (YKY, Istanbul)
 Afaki Haller (Futile Situations), 2012, (YKY, Istanbul)
 ÇıkışYollari (Exit Variations), 2016, (Can, Istanbul)
 Dedikodu (Rumour), 2016 (Alakarga, Istanbul)
 Tanıdık Bir Yüz (A Known Face), 2018 (Alakarga, Istanbul)
 Belki de (Possibly That), 2021, (Alakarga, Istanbul)

Other
 Ehram Yokuşu in Istanbul Sokakları (Streets of Istanbul), 2008 (YKY, Istanbul)
 Nocturne in Rencontre 2 (Encounter 2), 2009, (Éditions de l'Aire, Vevey)
 "to Antonio Tabucchi" in Yeraltına Mektuplar (Letters to underground), 2013, (YKY, Istanbul)
 "Sisyphus (with Cem Sağbil), 2014, İzmir
 "İç Dökmek ('Pouring Out' with Cem Sağbil), 2015, İstanbul

He published over 100 articles mainly in periodicals, newspapers specialized in art and culture, philosophy and literature.

His work is being translated into French.

He translated Antonio Tabucchi, Jorge Luis Borges, John Fowles, Juan Carlos Onetti into Turkish.

References

External links
 Münir Göle
 ad-galerie
 can yayınları
 YKY
 Editions de l'Aire

Turkish emigrants to Switzerland
Writers from Istanbul
Photographers from Istanbul
Living people
1961 births